Crazy is a novel by William Peter Blatty, released in November 2010 through Forge Books.

As with Blatty's previous release, Dimiter, Crazy is available in both hardcover and audiobook formats.

External links
TheNinthConfiguration.com - A website dedicated to William Peter Blatty, The Ninth Configuration & Legion
Forge Books

References 

2010 American novels
Novels by William Peter Blatty
Arab-American novels
Forge Books books